Evacuation Day may refer to:
 Evacuation Day (Massachusetts), the anniversary of departure of British army on March 17, 1776, celebrated in Greater Boston since 1901
 Evacuation Day (New York), the anniversary of departure of British army on November 25, 1783, celebrated annually until World War I
 Evacuation Day (Syria), the anniversary of departure of French army on April 17, 1946
 Evacuation Day (Tunisia), the anniversary of departure of French army on October 15, 1963